Oleksandr Mykhaylovych Syrota (born 11 June 2000) is a Ukrainian professional footballer who plays as a centre-back for Dynamo Kyiv.

Club career
Born in Kyiv, Syrota is a product of the Dynamo Kyiv youth sportive school.

He played for FC Dynamo in the Ukrainian Premier League Reserves and in December 2019 he was promoted to the senior squad team. Syrota made his debut in the Ukrainian Premier League for Dynamo Kyiv only on 4 July 2020, playing in a losing home match against FC Shakhtar Donetsk.

International career
In 2017, Syrota was a member of the Ukraine U17's squad, that participated at the UEFA European Under-17 Championship in Croatia, but not appeared in any game. 

Also he was called up for the Ukraine U21's matches in March 2020, but they were cancelled due to the COVID-19 pandemic.

He made his Ukraine national football team debut on 8 September 2021 in a friendly against the Czech Republic, a 1–1 away draw.

Career statistics

Club

International

Honours
Dynamo Kyiv
 Ukrainian Premier League: 2020–21
 Ukrainian Cup: 2019–20, 2020–21
 Ukrainian Super Cup: 2020

References

External links 
 
 

2000 births
Living people
Footballers from Kyiv
Ukrainian footballers
FC Dynamo Kyiv players
Ukrainian Premier League players
Association football defenders
Ukraine youth international footballers
Ukraine under-21 international footballers
Ukraine international footballers